Chryseobacterium piscium  is a bacterium from the genus of Chryseobacterium which has been isolated from a fish from the South Atlantic Ocean off the coast of South Africa

References

Further reading 
 
 

piscium
Bacteria described in 2006